Kachori is a sweet and spicy deep-fried snack, originating in India subcontinent, and common in places with Indian diaspora and other South Asian diaspora. Alternative names for the snack include kachauri, kachodi and katchuri.

History
Early known recipe similar to kachori comes from Susruta Samhita which mentions deep-fried pastry made from flour, ghee and jaggery and stuffed with spiced mung dal or minced meat. Another recipe for dish known as "Kacchari" a puffy deep-fried pastry stuffed with lentils finds mentioned in Jain text dating back to 7th century. Similar recipes also finds mentioned in medieval cookbook Supa Shastra. Kachori is believed to have originated in the Hindi belt region of India. In these states it is usually a round flattened ball made of fine flour filled with a stuffing of baked mixture of yellow moong dal or urad dal (Mung bean or Vigna mungo), besan (chickpea flour), black pepper, red chili powder, salt and other spices.

Banarasidas, the author of biographical Ardhakathanaka, has mentioned buying Kachoris in Indore in 1613. For seven months, he bought a ser of Kachoris daily, and owed twenty rupees.

Variations

Kota Kachori from Rajasthan is probably the most famous kachori in the state. The Pyaaj Kachori (onion kachori) is also very popular. Another form of Kachori in Jodhpur is the Mawa Kachori, invented by the late Rawat Deora. It is a sweet dish dipped in sugar syrup.

In Gujarat, it is usually a round ball made of flour and dough filled with a stuffing of yellow moong dal, black pepper, red chili powder, and ginger paste.

In Delhi it is often served as chaat. Delhi also has another kind of kachori, called 'Khasta kachori' or Raj Kachori (fast) kachori, made with potato, coconut, and sugar. Kachoris are often served with a chutney made from tamarind, mint, or coriander. Another type is fried and stuffed with pulses (urad and moong especially) and is generally found in the Kutch region of Gujarat.

In West Bengal and Bangladesh, a kachori (often pronounced kochuri) has a quite different variation. In West Bengal, kachori is softer and smaller. It is made mostly of white flour (maida) and asafoetida (hing), which are often added to improve its taste. It is mostly eaten as a tea-time snack in the morning or evening often accompanied with potato-peas curry and Bengali sweets. Also, a kachori stuffed with peas (koraishuti kochuri) is a winter delicacy in Bengal. Another variant in Bengal that exists mostly in sweet shops is the hard form (like in Delhi) with a masala inside called 'Khasta Kochuri'. Generally, no curry is accompanied by the khasta kochuri version.

Some of the variants in North India include a version similar to the Rajasthani one, accompanied by a curry made of potatoes and varied spices or even chana (chole) similar to one served in chole bhature.

Gallery

See also
 List of stuffed dishes
Samsa (food)
Sambusa
Chaat

References

Indian cuisine
Rajasthani cuisine
Indian fast food
Uttar Pradeshi cuisine
Bihari cuisine
North Indian cuisine
Desi culture
Punjabi cuisine
Bengali cuisine
Indo-Caribbean cuisine
Pakistani fast food
Stuffed dishes